The 2010 Missouri Senate elections were held on November 2, 2010. Voters in the 17 even-numbered districts of the Missouri Senate voted for their representatives. Other elections were also held on November 2. The Missouri Republican Party gained three seats and maintained control of the Missouri Senate.

Overview

Results

District 2

District 4

District 6

District 8

District 10

District 12

District 14

District 16

District 18

District 20

District 22

District 24

District 26

District 28

District 30

District 32

District 34

See also
United States Senate election in Missouri, 2010
Missouri state auditor election, 2010

References

External links 
 Results from Missouri Secretary of State

Senate
Missouri Senate elections
Missouri Senate